Bret Wallach (February 5, 1943) is an American cultural geographer, and professor at University of Oklahoma.

He graduated from University of California, Berkeley with an A.B. in 1964, M.A. in 1966, and Ph.D. in 1968.  He taught at the University of Victoria, Pennsylvania State University, University of California, Riverside, and University of Maine at Fort Kent.

Awards
 1984 MacArthur Fellows Program

Works
Understanding the Cultural Landscape. New York: the Guilford Press, 2004. 
Losing Asia: Modernization and the Culture of Development, Baltimore and London: The Johns Hopkins Press, 1996. 
At Odds with Progress: Americans and Conservation. Tucson: University of Arizona Press, 1991.

References

External links
"Bret Wallach", Google Scholar

American geographers
Living people
University of Oklahoma faculty
University of California, Berkeley alumni
MacArthur Fellows
Cultural geographers
Academic staff of the University of Victoria
Pennsylvania State University faculty
University of California, Riverside faculty
University of Maine at Fort Kent faculty
1943 births